Common names: Oaxacan dwarf boa.
Exiliboa is a monotypic genus created for the non-venomous dwarf boa species Exiliboa placata, which is endemic to southern Mexico. No subspecies are currently recognized.

Description
E. placata is shiny black in color.

Behavior
E. placata is fossorial.

Geographic range
E. placata is found in the Mexican state of Oaxaca in the Sierra de Juárez and Sierra Mixe near Totontepec. The type locality given is "near latitude 17° 37' N. and longitude 96° 25' W., at an elevation of approximately 2300 meters [7,546 feet] on the headwaters of the Río Valle Nacional on the northern slopes of the Sierra de Juárez, in the State of Oaxaca, Mexico".

Conservation status
E. placata is classified as Vulnerable (VU) on the IUCN Red List of Threatened Species with the following criteria: B1ab(iii) (v3.1, 2001). A species is listed as such when the best available evidence indicates that the geographic range, in the form of extent of occurrence, is estimated to be less than 20,000 km (7,772 sq mi), estimates indicate it to be severely fragmented or known to exist at no more than 10 locations, and a continuing decline has been observed, inferred or projected in the area, extent and/or quality of habitat. It is therefore considered to be facing a high risk of extinction in the wild. The population trend is down. Assessed in 2007.

References

External links

Further reading
Bogert CM (1968). "A New Genus and Species of Dwarf Boa from Southern Mexico". American Museum Novitates (2354): 1-38. (Exiliboa, new genus, p. 2; Exiliboa placata, new species, p. 6).

Tropidophiidae
Monotypic snake genera
Reptiles described in 1968
Taxa named by Charles Mitchill Bogert
Endemic reptiles of Mexico
Fauna of the Sierra Madre de Oaxaca